Perlo is a comune (municipality) in the Province of Cuneo in the Italian region Piedmont, located about  southeast of Turin and about  east of Cuneo.

Perlo borders the following municipalities: Bagnasco, Ceva, Massimino, Murialdo, Nucetto, and Priero.

Demographic evolution

References

Cities and towns in Piedmont